Świętopełk is a Polish male name of Slavic origin, meaning "one who has strong regiments". In various languages it is rendered as Suatopolc, Suatopolk, Swietopelk, Swantopolk, Swantepolk, Swantipolk, Swatopolk, Svante, Svatopluk, Zwentibold.

Świętopełk can refer to the following Polish historical characters:
Świętopełk Mieszkowic (c. 980–10th-century), son of Mieszko I of Poland and Oda von Haldensleben
Swietopelk I, Duke of Pomerania, Duke of Pomerelia (1109/1113–1121)
Swietopelk II, Duke of Pomerania, Duke of Pomerelia (1190/1200–1266)

See also
Sviatopolk (disambiguation) Ukrainian, Russian, Bulgarian version
Svatopluk (disambiguation) Czech version 
Svätopluk (disambiguation) Slovak version
Svante Swedish version
Zwentibold German version

Polish masculine given names
Slavic masculine given names
Masculine given names